Andraca theae is a moth of the family Endromidae. It is widely distributed in Taiwan and Southern China.

The wingspan is 35–37 mm. The head is densely covered with dark brown hairs. The forewing apex is inconspicuously falcate and the exterior margin is straight. The forewings and hindwings each have a dark discal spot.

The larvae feed on the leaves of Camellia tenuifolia and Camellia sinensis. They are gregarious. The first two instars feed on the back of leaves, from the leaf margin and veins and then move to another leaf. The third instar larvae aggregate on the trunk, produce silk and become ball-shaped. They are reddish brown, with a dorsolateral white streak. Mature larvae pupate in a cocoon spun on branches or fallen leaves, or underground. The pupa is reddish brown, rough and rugose.

Gallery

References

Moths described in 1909
Andraca
Taxa named by Shōnen Matsumura